Pelosia obtusoides is a moth of the family Erebidae. It is found on Madagascar.

Subspecies
Pelosia obtusoides obtusoides
Pelosia obtusoides sakalava (Toulgoët, 1960)

References

 

Lithosiina
Moths described in 1954